The Case of Itaewon Homicide (translit. Itaewon Salinsageon) is a 2009 South Korean film, based on the true story of the Itaewon murder case, which shocked Korea when Hongik college student Cho Jung-Pil was found dead at an Itaewon Burger King in 1997. The murder was investigated in 1997 by CID Agents J. Choi, D. Zeliff, T. Barnes and B. Crow.  Two troubled U.S. teenagers—Arthur Patterson (the son of a former U.S. Army officer and Korean mother) and Edward Lee—became suspects and were convicted.  Patterson was released a year later in a special amnesty and Lee was freed a year after that due to lack of evidence. The case never resulted in further convictions.  It stars Jang Keun-suk as Arthur Patterson and Jung Jin-young as his lawyer. Song Joong-ki played the victim. The film had 531,068 admissions in South Korea nationwide.

Cast
 Jung Jin-young as Prosecutor Park
 Jang Geun-suk as Robert J. Pearson (Arthur Patterson)
 Shin Seung-hwan as Alex "AJ" Jung (Edward Lee)
 Oh Kwang-rok as Attorney Kim Byeon
 Ko Chang-seok as Alex's father
 Song Joong-ki as Cho Jung-Pil (murder victim)
 Josh Carrott as David 
 Park Soo-young as Chief Choi	
 Kim Jung-ki as Judge
 Jung Woon-sun as Jung-Pil's elder sister
 Choi Il-hwa as Jung-Pil's father
 Kim Min-kyung as Jung-Pil's mother
 Song Young-chang
 Jo Seung-eun
 Park Jin-young as Attorney Jang
 Jin Kyung as Prosecutor Park's wife

Extradition of Arthur Patterson
With renewed public attention after the movie release, public prosecutors in South Korea reopened the case after discovering DNA evidence purported to show Patterson as the murderer. Edward Lee had previously testified to Patterson being the murderer during the first trial.  Patterson was re-arrested by U.S. authorities in May 2011 and went before a court hearing in California concerning extradition to Korea for a new trial. Arthur Patterson's extradition to South Korea was approved and culminated with his arrival at Incheon International Airport, Sep. 2015. 

Murder Trial and Conviction

During the four-month trial, Patterson repeatedly claimed that he was innocent and accused Lee of having killed Cho. Lee testified as a witness saying that he clearly saw Patterson turn to Cho to stab him. In January 2016, the prosecution sought a 20-year prison term for Patterson, which under Korean law is the maximum sentence able to be handed down to suspects aged 18 or less at the time of their crime. On January 28, 2016, Patterson was found guilty of the stabbing of the victim, Cho Jung-Pil, and was sentenced to 20 years behind bars. Patterson and his lawyers have said they plan to appeal the verdict.

Appeals

On Monday, February 1, 2016, local officials in Seoul, South Korea, informed the public that Arthur Patterson lodged an appeal with a higher court. Patterson is still adamantly denying the charges and continues to blame Lee for the stabbing death of Cho Joong-Pil. The appeal will deal with issues such as evidence accepted by the court and its legitimacy, and possible mistakes in the application of law.

References

External links
 The Case of Itaewon Homicide   at HanCinema
 
 

2009 crime drama films
2009 films
Crime films based on actual events
2000s Korean-language films
2000s legal drama films
South Korean crime drama films
South Korean films based on actual events
2000s South Korean films
Itaewon
Showbox films
Sponge Entertainment films